Julian "J.T." Dorsey, born August 29, 1975 in Coatesville, Pennsylvania is a U.S. soccer defender who last played for the USL Second Division side Harrisburg City Islanders.

Dorsey attended Loyola University Maryland.  On May 4, 2004, he signed with the Harrisburg City Islanders.

He currently runs the J.T. Dorsey foundation.

References

External links
J.T. Dorsey foundation official site

1975 births
Living people
American soccer players
Penn FC players
Delaware Wizards players
Loyola Greyhounds men's soccer players
Reading United A.C. players
Connecticut Wolves players
Hershey Wildcats players
USL Second Division players
Association football defenders